Brinsford may refer to:

 Brinsford (HM Prison), a prison and Young Offenders Institution in Wolverhampton
 Brinsford Lodge, a former hall of residence for The Polytechnic, Wolverhampton (now the University of Wolverhampton)
 Brinsford Parkway railway station, a prospective new parkway railway station to the north of Wolverhampton